Morgan Stilma (born 19 June 2000) is a Dutch-Spanish basketball player.

Early career
Stilma was born in Marbella, Spain to a Dutch father and Italian mother. He played for the junior teams of Fuengirola and Baloncesto Málaga.

Professional career
In the 2018–19 season, Stilma made his debut for Baloncesto Málaga in the Liga ACB, playing 5 games. In the 2019–20 season, he played in one ACB and two EuroCup games with the team. He also played 10 games in the LEB Plata with Villarrobledo.

On 26 June 2020, Stilma signed a three-year contract with Heroes Den Bosch in the Netherlands. He won the 2021–22 Dutch national championship with Heroes. After the season, the club decided to dissolve his contract.

On 18 July 2022, Stigma signed with CB Zamora, returning to the LEB Plata for a second stint in the league.

National team career
Stilma played with the Netherlands under-18 national team and helped his country win the gold medal at 2018 FIBA Europe Under-18 Championship Division B in Skopje.

References

External links
RealGM Profile

2000 births
Living people
Baloncesto Málaga players
Heroes Den Bosch players
Centers (basketball)
CB Villarrobledo players
Dutch men's basketball players
People from Marbella
Spanish men's basketball players
Spanish people of Dutch descent
Spanish people of Italian descent
Dutch people of Spanish descent
Dutch people of Italian descent
Sportspeople from the Province of Málaga